WCPE (89.7 FM) in Raleigh, North Carolina, is a listener supported non-commercial, non-profit radio station, and the program contributor for The Classical Station, a classical music network. Both are owned by the Educational Information Corporation, a nonprofit community organization.  The station went on the air July 17, 1978, and switched to a 24-hour classical music format in 1984.  In 1978, the first piece played on The Classical Station was the Saint Seans Organ Symphony played on a 12 inch LP, and to that day The Classical Station had bookshelves full of records until the 1980s. 

WCPE's studios are located just outside Wake Forest, North Carolina. Its main signal extends from the South Carolina state line to the suburbs of Richmond, Virginia, and some parts of Charlotte, North Carolina, as well.

Overview
WCPE's call letters do not stand for anything in particular; the station simply did not have the money to petition the FCC for a specific set of call letters, but was happy with the result.

WCPE operates three full-power satellite stations in the Outer Banks of eastern North Carolina, as well as a network of low-powered translators across the state.  It can also be heard on cable television systems, on free-to-air (open format) "small dish" home satellite systems via the AMC-1 satellites, and around the world via six streaming audio formats on the Internet, including mp3, Ogg Vorbis, QuickTime, RealAudio, iTunes, and WMA.  The station also streams via IPv6.

It also distributes its classical music format to affiliate stations in ten states as a service entitled Great Classical Music.  The Classical Station was the first station in Central North Carolina to broadcast a compact disc.  

As of December 2007, WCPE has lost access to its C-Band (Big dish) transponder.

Helms-Leahy Small Webcaster Settlement Act of 2002
In November 2002 WCPE and its founder and General Manager, Deborah Proctor was recognized by Senator Jesse Helms for her contribution in the Helms-Leahy Small Webcaster Settlement Act of 2002. This act helped settle a dispute regarding the amount of royalties webcasters must pay in order to perform sound recordings over the Internet bringing stability to the then-emerging webcasting industry.

The North Carolina Award
On Saturday, November 6, 2019, founder and General Manager, Deborah Proctor was recognized by Governor Roy Cooper with North Carolina's highest civilian honor, the North Carolina Award. Proctor was recognized for her efforts to promote and help small, independent and public broadcasters remain viable in the era of online broadcasting.

Simulcasts and translators

WZPE is owned by the Educational Information Corporation, while WURI is owned by the University of North Carolina at Chapel Hill and leased to WCPE.

In 2016, WCPE's programming in Buxton moved from high-power WBUX (90.5 FM) to W216BE. Both facilities are owned by WUNC, which WBUX now retransmits.

References

External links
 WCPE website
Rebroadcast consent letter, retrieved July 2, 2021.

Classical music radio stations in the United States
CPE
Wake Forest, North Carolina
NPR member stations
Radio stations established in 1978
1978 establishments in North Carolina